The Ugliest Pilgrim is a southern gothic short story by American writer Doris Betts. It was first published in the Red Clay Reader, an annual magazine focusing on the work of southern authors and artists.

Plot synopsis 
The story follows Violet Karl a disfigured woman in her late twenties who travels by bus from her home in Spruce Pine, North Carolina to Tulsa, Oklahoma in the hopes of being healed by a televangelist.

Adaptations 
The first adaption of "The Ugliest Pilgrim" was a 1981 film titled Violet. The short film was directed by Shelley Levinson and starring Didi Conn. It won the Oscar for Best Live Action Short Film in 1982. 

A musical adaption "The Ugliest Pilgrim" also titled Violet was made. With music by Jeanine Tesori and libretto by Brian Crawley. The musical premiered Off-Broadway in 1997 and won the Drama Critics' Circle Award and Lucille Lortel Award as Best Musical.

References 

Southern Gothic short stories
1969 short stories
American short stories
Short stories adapted into films